Monika Aleksandra Kotzian is a Polish para-snowboarder. Born without a left hand and forearm, she competes in the SB-UL category.

Life and career 
Kotzian competed at the 2019 World Para Snowboard Championships, winning the gold and bronze in the snowboard cross and banked slalom respectively. She won the gold medal in the women's dual banked slalom at the 2021 World Para Snow Sports Championships held in Lillehammer, Norway. She also won the gold medal in the women's snowboard cross event.

References

External links 
 
 Monika Kotzian at World Para Snowboard

Date of birth missing (living people)
Living people
Polish female snowboarders
Place of birth missing (living people)
Year of birth missing (living people)
21st-century Polish women